Phlox is an unincorporated community in the town of Norwood, Langlade County, Wisconsin, United States. It is situated on Wisconsin Highway 47 southeast of Antigo. Phlox has a post office with ZIP code 54464. In the Menominee language it is called Omāhkahkow-Menīkān which means "frog town". It lies within ancestral Menominee territory which was ceded to the United States in the 1836 Treaty of the Cedars.

Climate
The Köppen Climate Classification subtype for this climate is "Dfb" (Warm Summer Continental Climate).
<div style="width:75%;">

Images

References

Unincorporated communities in Langlade County, Wisconsin
Unincorporated communities in Wisconsin